Events in the year 1749 in Spain.

Incumbents
Monarch: Ferdinand VI
Secretary of State: Zenón de Somodevilla, 1st Marqués de la Ensenada

Events
July 30 - Great Gypsy Round-up

Births
September 21 - Mariano Álvarez de Castro (d. 1810)

References